United Air Lines Flight 34 was a scheduled flight departing from San Francisco to Los Angeles, California, on December 27, 1936. At 7:36 am (Pacific time), the co-pilot requested the UAL localizer beacon at Burbank be turned on. The company radio requested aircraft position, to which the co-pilot replied, "just a minute." The aircraft crashed at the head of Rice Canyon (near Newhall, California) at 7:38 am, killing all 12 passengers and crew. The probable cause was found to be "...an error on the part of the pilot for attempting to fly through Newhall pass at an altitude lower than the surrounding mountains without first determining by radio the existing weather."

References

External links
 Bureau of Air Commerce Accident Report (PDF)

History of Los Angeles County, California
34
Disasters in California
Airliner accidents and incidents in California
Accidents and incidents involving the Boeing 247
1936 in California
Aviation accidents and incidents in the United States in 1936